Zaykovo is a rural locality (a village) in Kukushtanskoye Rural Settlement, Permsky District, Perm Krai, Russia. The population was 47 as of 2010.

Geography 
Zaykovo is located 52 km south of Perm (the district's administrative centre) by road. Kukushtan is the nearest rural locality.

References 

Rural localities in Permsky District